Talking Back to the Night is the third solo studio album by English recording artist Steve Winwood. Released less than two years after the top 3 hit Arc of a Diver, it failed to see as much success as its predecessor, reaching #28 on the Billboard 200. "Valerie" was a minor hit in 1982, but when it and the title track were remixed and re-released in 1987 for Chronicles, the newer version of Valerie became a top 10 hit, while the remix of "Talking Back to the Night" hit the Billboard Hot 100, but failed to crack the Top 40. The track "Help Me Angel" was also remixed for Chronicles, and was then released for the first time as a single.

Winwood performed all of the instruments on this album.

Critical reception 
Reviewing for Rolling Stone in 1982, Parke Puterbaugh said the album is "for the most part a bland, easy-listening electropop rut".

Track listing

Personnel 
 Steve Winwood – lead and backing vocals, Prophet-5, Hammond B3 organ, Roland VP-330 Vocoder, Multimoog, Linn LM-1 programming, Hayman drums, Ludwig snare drum, percussion
 Nicole Winwood – backing vocals (tracks 2 and 5)

Production 
 Steve Winwood – producer, engineer, mixing 
 John "Nobby" Clarke – assistant engineer 
 Lynn Goldsmith – photography 
 Tony Wright – artwork

Charts

Weekly charts

Year-end charts

Certifications

}

References

Steve Winwood albums
1982 albums
Island Records albums
Albums produced by Steve Winwood